Erik Harald Høie Compton (born November 11, 1979) is a Norwegian-American professional golfer.

Compton was born in Miami, Florida, to an American father and a Norwegian mother and holds dual citizenship. He attended the University of Georgia and played on the 2001 Palmer Cup and Walker Cup teams. He has had two heart transplants.

Medical condition
When he was nine, Compton was diagnosed with viral cardiomyopathy, a condition where the heart muscle is inflamed and unable to pump as hard as it should. This condition has resulted in him undergoing two successful heart transplants, the first being in 1992 when Compton was 12, and the second taking place in 2008. During the Masters Tournament at Augusta, Georgia in April 2009, Compton received the Ben Hogan Award, which is given annually to a golfer who has stayed active in golf despite a physical handicap or serious illness. He also gained recognition for his attempts to be allowed the use of a golf cart during qualifying rounds for PGA Tour and Nationwide Tour events.

Professional career
After graduating from the University of Georgia, Compton turned professional in 2001. He played on the Nationwide Tour in 2002 and again from 2005 to 2007. His best finish was a T2 at the 2004 Preferred Health Systems Wichita Open.

Compton played on the Canadian Tour in 2003 and 2004. In 2004, he dominated the Canadian Tour, winning twice and also winning the Order of Merit title. He also won the 2004 Hassan II Golf Trophy in Morocco.

Compton has also played the mini-tours, winning a few events on the NGA Hooters Tour. He played in thirty PGA Tour events as a non-member from 2000 to 2011 through sponsor exemptions and qualifying, making the cut 18 times. His best PGA Tour finish as a non-member was T25 in the 2011 Northern Trust Open. In 2010, Compton advanced to the Tour's final round of qualifying school. He finished tied for 100th, which granted him conditional Nationwide Tour status. In 2011, Compton won the Mexico Open, his first win on a major golf tour. Compton finished 13th on the money list, good enough for a PGA Tour Card for 2012.

In 2012, Compton made 16 of 26 cuts on the PGA Tour. His best finish was T-13 at the John Deere Classic. He finished 163rd on the money list, failing to retain his tour card. He returned to qualifying school and finished T-7 to regain his card for 2013. In 2013, he recorded his first top-10 finish by placing T-4 at The Honda Classic in March. He qualified for the FedEx Cup playoffs and finished the 2013 points in 99th place to retain his card and full playing rights.

In 2014 Compton had his best season on tour, recording three top-10s, qualifying for the playoffs and finishing 64th in FedEx Cup points. Also, that season, he recorded his best PGA Tour finish to date, when he tied for 2nd at the 2014 U.S. Open, which also earned him his first invitation to the Masters Tournament and the 2015 U.S. Open.

During the 2015 season Compton recorded one top-10 and finished the season 124th in FedEx Cup points, which was good enough to keep his card for 2016. In 2016, Compton missed many cuts and was even disqualified from the John Deere Classic for missing the Wednesday Pro-Am. As a result, he finished the season in 173rd and lost his tour card. He has played primarily on the Korn Ferry Tour since.

Amateur wins
2001 Monroe Invitational

Professional wins (7)

Korn Ferry Tour wins (1)

Korn Ferry Tour playoff record (0–2)

Canadian Tour wins (3)

NGA Hooters Tour wins (2)
2 wins

Other wins (1)

Results in major championships

CUT = missed the half-way cut
"T" = tied

Summary

U.S. national team appearances
Amateur
Palmer Cup: 2001 (winners)
Walker Cup: 2001

See also
2011 Nationwide Tour graduates
2012 PGA Tour Qualifying School graduates
List of organ transplant donors and recipients

References

External links

American male golfers
Georgia Bulldogs men's golfers
PGA Tour golfers
Korn Ferry Tour graduates
Golfers from Miami
Heart transplant recipients
Sportspeople from Coral Gables, Florida
American people of Norwegian descent
1979 births
Living people